Sonia Bohosiewicz (born 9 December 1975) is a Polish actress, cabaret artist and singer. She has appeared in such films as Rezerwat, Obława and Polish-Russian War and the television series Czas honoru.

Early life 
She was born into a family of Polish Armenians. She has three siblings: brothers Łukasz (born 1973) and Mateusz (born 1988), and sister Maja (born 1990). Both Maja and cousin Jakub Bohosiewicz are also actors.

Until the beginning of her studies, she lived in Żory, where she attended elementary school and then the Karol Miarka Liceum. In the last year of high school, she participated in acting workshops with Dorota Pomykała at the art-play studio. She graduated from the AST National Academy of Theatre Arts in Kraków.

Personal life 
In 2008, she married Paweł Majewski, son of director Janusz Majewski. The couple has two sons, Teodor (born 9 January 2009) and Leonard (born 22 April 2012).

Filmography

Dubbing

References

External links
 

1975 births
Living people
Polish film actresses
Polish television actresses